An eft is the terrestrial juvenile phase of a newt.

EFT, EfT, or eft also may refer to:

 École Française de Téhéran, a French international school in Tehran, Iran
 Ecosystem Functional Type
 Effective field theory
 Electrical Fast Transient, see Transient (oscillation)
 Electronic funds transfer
 Emotionally focused therapy
 Emotional Freedom Techniques
 Escape from Tarkov
 Evangelical Fellowship of Thailand
 Ewing family of tumors
 Exploration Flight Test-1 (5 December 2014), for the NASA Constellation/Ares/SLS Program Orion Crew Vehicle
 Monroe Municipal Airport (FAA id: EFT), in Wisconsin, United States

See also

EFTS (disambiguation)